The American Mammoth Jackstock is a breed of North American donkey, descended from large donkeys imported to the United States from about 1785. George Washington, with Henry Clay and others, bred for an ass that could be used to produce strong work mules. Washington was offering his jacks for stud service by 1788. Large breeds of asses were found in Kentucky by 1800.  Breeds that influenced the Mammoth Jack include the Maltese, the Baudet du Poitou, the Andalusian, the Majorcan and the Catalan. 

Measured from the ground to the withers, Jacks (entire males) must stand at least , and jennies or jennets (females) at least  in order to be classified as mammoth size. The American Mammoth Jackstock Registry has more stringent requirements: minimum 14 hands and 7.5” cannon bone circumference for jennets and geldings; minimum 14.2 hands and 8” cannon bone circumference for jacks; 61” heart girth in all cases

References

External links

American Mammoth Jackstock Association
American Donkey and Mule Society
American Mammoth Jackstock Registry

Donkey breeds originating in the United States
Donkey breeds
Conservation Priority Breeds of the Livestock Conservancy